Bear Brook is a tributary of the Millstone River in central New Jersey in the United States.

Course
It flows west, crossing the New Jersey Turnpike and Route 130 and flowing through the Bear Brook Park Acquisition. It turns northeast to join another tributary and continues flowing northwest, receiving more tributaries.

Sister tributaries
Beden Brook
Cranbury Brook
Devils Brook
Harrys Brook
Heathcote Brook
Indian Run Brook
Little Bear Brook
Millstone Brook
Peace Brook
Rocky Brook
Royce Brook
Simonson Brook
Six Mile Run
Stony Brook
Ten Mile Run
Van Horn Brook

See also
List of rivers of New Jersey

References

External links
USGS Coordinates in Google Maps

Tributaries of the Raritan River
Rivers of New Jersey
Rivers of Mercer County, New Jersey